This is a list of some of the more notable protected areas established in 2013.

See also
2013 in the environment